Ettedgui may refer to:

Ettedgui Synagogue, a synagogue in Casablanca, Morocco
Joseph Ettedgui (1936-2010), British fashion retailer